Christian Whitehead, also known by his alias The Taxman, is an Australian video game programmer and designer. He is most recognized for his work creating updated ports of early games in Sega's Sonic the Hedgehog series, as well as being the lead developer of an original game in the series, Sonic Mania. He has also developed multiple remakes of classic Sonic games and most recently, the remasters in Sonic Origins.

Career 
In 2006, Whitehead worked as a freelance 3D animator with the company Kine Graffiti. Since 2009, he has focused on game development, developing various fangames based on the Sonic the Hedgehog series. In 2009, Whitehead produced a "proof-of-concept" video of Sonic CD running on an iPhone using his own custom engine, the "Retro Engine". In an interview with Steven O'Donnell of Good Game: Spawn Point, Whitehead proclaims that he spent "about a year or so" convincing Sega to let him work on the Sonic CD port. In 2009, a video regarding Sonic CD from Whitehead was taken down, leading Eurogamer to report that Whitehead possibly faced a cease and desist letter from Sega, which Whitehead claimed was false. The port was released for Xbox 360, PlayStation 3, iPhone and Android in 2011. His remake was so successful that he, along with developer Simon "Stealth" Thomley of the studio Headcannon, would later be commissioned to remaster Sonic the Hedgehog and Sonic the Hedgehog 2 for mobile devices.

Although he, along with Headcannon, released a proof-of-concept video for a Sonic the Hedgehog 3 remaster in 2014, Sega did not greenlight the port. In 2015, it was announced that Whitehead would be involved in his first non-Sonic game, Freedom Planet 2. In 2017, Whitehead, in collaboration with Headcannon and PagodaWest Games, developed and released their own original title in the Sonic series, titled Sonic Mania. In 2018, Sonic Mania became Sonic Mania Plus, with the release of the Encore DLC. Sonic Mania Plus was developed by Whitehead, Headcannon, PagodaWest Games, and the now included HyperKinetic. Whitehead also contributed to the development of Sonic Origins, providing a new version of the engine used in the remasters. Whitehead is currently working on Freedom Planet 2, built with the Unity engine, for PC, Mac, and Linux. 

In late 2018, Whitehead and other development members behind Sonic Mania founded their own studio Evening Star Studio, where he serves as creative director and lead engine architect.

Works

References

External links 

Year of birth missing (living people)
Living people
Australian computer programmers
Australian video game designers
Indie video game developers
Sonic the Hedgehog
Video game programmers